The 1962 NCAA University Division football season was played by American football teams representing 140 colleges and universities recognized by the National Collegiate Athletic Association (NCAA) as major programs.  The remaining 370 colleges and universities that were NCAA members and fielded football teams competed in the 1962 NCAA College Division football season.

During the 20th century, the NCAA had no playoff for the major college football teams in the University Division, later known as Division I-A. The NCAA did recognize a national champion based upon the final results of "wire service" (AP and UPI) polls.  The extent of that recognition came in the form of acknowledgment in the annual NCAA Football Guide of the "unofficial" national champions.  The AP poll in 1962 consisted of the votes of 52 sportswriters, each of whom would give their opinion of the ten best teams.  Under a point system of 10 points for first place, 9 for second, etc., the "overall" ranking was determined.  Although the rankings were based on the collective opinion of the representative sportswriters, the teams that remained "unbeaten and untied" were generally ranked higher than those that had not.  A defeat, even against a strong opponent, tended to cause a team to drop in the rankings, and a team with two or more defeats was unlikely to remain in the Top 10. The top teams played on New Year's Day in the four major postseason bowl games: the Rose (near Los Angeles at Pasadena), Sugar (New Orleans), Orange (Miami) and Cotton (Dallas).

Rule changes
 Reduced the penalty for illegal shift from 15 to five yards.
 Allows punts downed inside the 10 yard line to be spotted where the punt is downed.  Previously these punts were returned to the 20 yard line (touchback).
 Increased to 15 yards the penalty for the defense kicking a forward pass or a placekick held by an opponent.

Conference and program changes
Conference changes
Four conferences began play in 1962:College Athletic Conference – an active NCAA Division III conference that ended sponsorship of football after the 2017 season; known as the Southern Collegiate Athletic Conference after the 1991 seasonGateway Conference – active through the 1974 season
Western Athletic Conference – began play with former members of the Border Conference (Arizona and Arizona State) and the Skyline Conference (BYU, New Mexico, Utah, and Wyoming). The remaining members of the Border (Hardin–Simmons, New Mexico State, Texas Western, and West Texas State) and the Skyline (Colorado State, Montana, and Utah State) became independents. The only exception was Denver, who dropped its football program entirely.
One conference upgraded to the NCAA University Division in 1962:
 Mid-American Conference – moved up from the College Division to the University Division beginning in 1962. The conference had been considered among the best in the college division. The previous year two MAC schools, Western Michigan and Bowling Green, were invited to bowl games. The conference produced college division national champions Ohio in 1960 and Bowling Green in 1959. In addition, Miami of Ohio finished second in the final 1958 College Division poll and was ranked in the final major AP and UPI polls in 1955.

Membership changes

September
In the preseason poll released on September 17, Ohio State was the No. 1 choice for 45 of the 50 voters, and its Big Ten rival, Michigan State was 4th overall.  Texas placed second, and SEC rivals Alabama and Louisiana State (LSU) were third and fifth respectively.  As the regular season progressed, a new poll would be issued on the Monday following the weekend's games.  Ohio State, Michigan State and the other Big Ten schools would not kick off until September 29.  On September 22, No. 2 Texas beat Oregon at home, 25–13.  No. 3 Alabama and No. 5 LSU both recorded shutouts, defeating Georgia (at Birmingham 35–0) and Texas A&M (21–0) respectively.  In the poll that followed, Alabama rose to No. 1, while Ohio State and Texas fell to 2nd and 3rd.  Penn State, which had beaten Navy at home 41–7, rose from 9th to 4th, while LSU remained at No. 5.  Also on the 22nd, the first games of the newly formed Western Athletic Conference took place as Arizona beat BYU, 27–21, and New Mexico beat Wyoming 25–21.  All six of the charter members (including Arizona State and Utah) had withdrawn by 1999.

The following Friday, No. 1 Alabama beat Tulane in New Orleans, 44–6.  On September 29, No. 2 Ohio State beat North Carolina at home, 41–7.  No. 3 Texas registered a shutout on the road against Texas Tech, 34–0 while No. 4 Penn State hosted Air Force, winning 20–6.  In Baton Rouge, No. 5 LSU played Rice to a 6–6 tie, enough to knock it from the Top Ten.  In the poll that followed, Ohio State was again No. 1, followed by No. 2 Alabama, No. 3 Texas, and No. 4 Penn State. No. 8 Georgia Tech, which had blanked Florida in Gainesville, 17–0, rose to 5th.

October
On October 6, No. 1 Ohio State was upset by the UCLA Bruins in Los Angeles, 9–7.  No. 2 Alabama beat Vanderbilt in Birmingham, 17–7.  No. 3 Texas hosted Tulane (fresh from a 44–6 loss to Alabama) and won 35–8.  No. 4 Penn State beat Rice at Houston, 18–7.  No. 5 Georgia Tech lost to LSU in Atlanta, 10–7, and dropped back out of the poll. No. 6 USC won 7–0 at Iowa, while No. 7 Mississippi defeated Houston 40–7. The next poll was No. 1 Alabama, No. 2 Texas, No. 3 Penn State, No. 4 USC, and No. 5 Mississippi.

October 13 No. 1 Alabama beat Houston 14–3 at home. No. 2 Texas survived its Dallas encounter with Oklahoma, 9–6. No. 3 Penn State lost to Army at West Point by the same 9–6 margin.  No. 4 USC and No. 5 Mississippi were both idle. No. 6 LSU improved its record to 3–0–1 with a 17–3 win against the visiting Miami Hurricanes.  Though Alabama got more first place votes than Texas in the poll (24 vs. 21) the Longhorns had more points overall, and were the new No. 1. The results were No. 1 Texas, No. 2 Alabama, No. 3 USC, No. 4 LSU, and No. 5 Mississippi.

On October 20, all five of the top teams remained unbeaten.  No. 1 Texas beat No. 7 Arkansas 7–3 at home.  No. 2 Alabama defeated Tennessee at Knoxville, 27–7.  The No. 3 USC Trojans hosted California and won 32–3.  No. 4 LSU beat Kentucky at Lexington 7–0 and No. 5 Mississippi shut out Tulane in New Orleans, 21–0.  Nevertheless, LSU and Mississippi dropped to 6th and 7th in the next poll, while Big Ten rivals No. 8 Northwestern and No. 10 Wisconsin reached the Top 5.  Northwestern had beaten No. 6 Ohio State 18–14 at Columbus, while Wisconsin thrashed Iowa 42–14.  The rankings were No. 1 Texas, No. 2 Alabama, No. 3 Northwestern, No. 4 USC, and No. 5 Wisconsin.

In the first weekend after the resolution of the Cuban Missile Crisis, week 7's games were played on October 27.  45 days after President Kennedy asked "Why does Rice play Texas?" in a speech at Rice Stadium, the 0–3–1 Owls tied the No. 1 Longhorns on the same field, 14–14.  No. 2 Alabama beat Tulsa 35–6 and No. 3 Northwestern defeated Notre Dame 35–6 at home.  No. 4 USC won 28–16 over Illinois at Champaign, and No. 5 Wisconsin lost to Ohio State at Columbus, 14–7.  The No. 6 LSU Tigers shut out Florida 23–0 at home.  The Northwestern Wildcats were voted into first place, followed by No. 2 Alabama, No. 3 USC, No. 4 LSU, and No. 5 Texas.

November
November 3 No. 1 Northwestern narrowly defeated Indiana, 26–21, at Bloomington.  No. 2 Alabama and No. 3 USC shut out Mississippi State (20–0) and No. 9 Washington (14–0), respectively.  No. 4 LSU lost 15–7 at home to No. 7 Mississippi, which had been 0–2–1 against LSU and 27–0 against all other opponents in the last three regular seasons. No. 5 Texas got past SMU at home, 6–0.  The next poll was No. 1 Northwestern, No. 2 USC, No. 3 Alabama, No. 4 Mississippi, and No. 5 Texas.

November 10 No. 1 Northwestern was beaten at Madison by No. 8 Wisconsin, 37–6.  No. 3 Alabama beat Miami 36–3 and No. 2 USC won at Stanford, 39–14.  No. 4 Mississippi defeated UT-Chattanooga 52–7, and No. 5 Texas won at Baylor, 27–12.  With the return of Wisconsin to the Top 5 and Northwestern dropping out, the poll was No. 1 Alabama, No. 2 USC, No. 3 Mississippi, No. 4 Wisconsin, and No. 5 Texas.

November 17 No. 1 Alabama travelled to Atlanta and lost to Georgia Tech, 7–6.  No. 2 USC defeated Navy, 13–6, at home. No. 3 Mississippi beat Tennessee at Knoxville, 19–6. No. 4 Wisconsin won at Illinois, 35–6, and No. 5 Texas beat Texas Christian, 14–0. No. 8 Minnesota defeated Purdue 7–6. The last two unbeaten and untied teams, USC and Mississippi, were first and second in the next poll, followed by No. 3 Wisconsin, No. 4 Texas, and No. 5 Minnesota.

On Thanksgiving Day (the 22nd), No. 4 Texas hosted Texas A&M and won 13–3 to clinch the Southwestern Conference title and the Cotton Bowl bid, half a game ahead of Arkansas.  On November 24 No. 1 USC beat UCLA, 14–3, extending its record to 9–0–0 and finishing a game ahead of Washington for the AAWU title and the Rose Bowl bid.  No. 2 Mississippi was idle.  USC's bowl opponent was determined in the season-ending game between No. 3 Wisconsin and No. 5 Minnesota, both 5–1–0 in Big Ten conference play.  They met at Madison and the Badgers won on their home field, 14–9, to take the Big Ten title and the trip to the Rose Bowl. In the penultimate poll, USC retained the No. 1 spot, and Wisconsin was 2nd with an 8–1–0 record.  Despite being unbeaten and untied, Mississippi placed third in the voting, followed by No. 4 Texas and No. 5 Alabama.  The stage was set for a meeting of No. 1 and No. 2 at the Rose Bowl on New Year's Day, the first time in the 26-year history of the AP Poll that the top two teams would face off against each other in a bowl game.

December 1, No. 1 USC closed a perfect season by beating Notre Dame 25–0 in Los Angeles for a 10–0–0 finish.  No. 3 Mississippi beat Mississippi State 13–6 at home to close with a 9–0–0 record, the SEC championship, and a trip to the Sugar Bowl against No. 6 Arkansas, while No. 5 Alabama beat Auburn 38–0 in the season-ender at Birmingham to close their season at 10–1–0 and second place.  The Tide accepted a bid to face the Big 8 champions, No. 8 Oklahoma, in the Orange Bowl. No. 7 LSU, the SEC's third-place finisher, filled the final major bowl slot by accepting a bid to the Cotton Bowl against Texas. The final AP poll, which determined the unofficial national championship, was released on December 3.  USC finished first, followed by No. 2 Wisconsin, No. 3 Mississippi, No. 4 Texas, and No. 5 Alabama.   The NCAA Football Guide recognized the University of Southern California as the 1962 champion as number one in both the AP poll and the UPI poll.

Conference standings

Bowl games
The 1962–1963 Bowl Season is notable for the 1963 Rose Bowl.  This game is the first No. 1 versus No. 2 bowl game pairing in the history of the AP Poll and the UPI Poll, both singly and jointly.  However, neither poll published rankings after the bowl games at this time, so USC was already the season-ending No. 1 and would remain so, regardless of the outcome of the game.

Major bowlsTuesday, January 1, 1963Other bowls
Games played in December 1962

Heisman Trophy votingThe Heisman Trophy is given to the year's most outstanding player''Source:'''

See also
 1962 NCAA University Division football rankings
 1962 College Football All-America Team

References